Atwood is an unincorporated community in Prairie Township, Kosciusko County, in the U.S. state of Indiana.

History
Originally named "Mount Ruska," Atwood was laid out as a village on September 29, 1857.  It was an important trading point due to the Pittsburgh, Fort Wayne, and Chicago Railway passing through its boundaries.  By a petition of the citizens in 1865, the town's name was officially changed to Atwood.

The post office at Atwood has been in operation since 1864.

Geography

Schools
Atwood was home to the Atwood Greyhounds. Those who had attended Atwood Elementary now attend Warsaw Community High School.

Notable people
Harold Achor; Justice of the Indiana Supreme Court
Emery Andrew Rovenstine; renowned anesthesiologist
Hobart Creighton; Speaker of the Indiana House of Representatives (1942-1948), Republican nominee for Indiana Governor (1948)

References

Unincorporated communities in Kosciusko County, Indiana
1857 establishments in Indiana
Unincorporated communities in Indiana